Hammer House of Mystery and Suspense is a short-lived (one season) anthology television series produced in Britain in 1984/85 by Hammer Film Productions. Though similar in format to the 1980 series Hammer House of Horror, the Mystery and Suspense series had feature-length episodes, usually running around 70 minutes without commercials.

The series was a co-production by Hammer Film Productions with 20th Century Fox Television (as was the 1968 anthology series Journey to the Unknown), and is known in the United States as Fox Mystery Theater. It was first aired in the UK by ITV in 1984, though it was shown in different timeslots (and a different running order) throughout the various ITV regions.

Episodes

Two of the episodes, "A Distant Scream" and "In Possession", were remakes of stories that had been made for the fourth season of the BBC anthology series Out of the Unknown, originally titled "The Last Witness" and "The Uninvited". The master videotapes for both of the original teleplays were wiped by the corporation during the 1970s and no copies are known to exist, leaving only still photographs, a short video clip of "The Last Witness" and a complete audio recording of "The Uninvited" surviving. "A Distant Scream" and "In Possession" are effectively the only way these two stories can be viewed in a full audio-visual format.

Home media
The series was released as a six-DVD set in the UK in 2006, currently out-of-print. In Germany, a four-DVD set was released in March 2018 under the title Vorsicht, Hochspannung!.

External links

British horror fiction television series
Hammer Film Productions
ITV television dramas
Television series by 20th Century Fox Television
1984 British television series debuts
1984 British television series endings
1980s British drama television series
1980s British anthology television series
English-language television shows